Mansur Ahmed Gazi (died 1 February 2021) was a Bangladesh Awami League politician and the former Member of Parliament of Satkhira-4.

Career
Ahmed was elected to parliament from Satkhira-4 as a Bangladesh Awami League candidate in 1986 and 1991. He is the President of Satkhira District unit of Bangladesh Awami League.

Ahmed was defeated from Satkhira-4 constituency on 12 June 1996 on the nomination of Bangladesh Awami League.

References

20th-century births
2021 deaths
People from Satkhira District
Awami League politicians
3rd Jatiya Sangsad members
5th Jatiya Sangsad members
Year of birth missing
Place of birth missing